Namibiocesa is a genus of tephritid  or fruit flies in the family Tephritidae.

Species
Namibiocesa barbata (Munro, 1929)
Namibiocesa incana (Munro, 1963)
Namibiocesa oryx (Munro, 1956)

References

Tephritinae
Tephritidae genera
Diptera of Africa